is a Japanese footballer who currently plays as a forward for Iwate Grulla Morioka.

Career statistics

Club
.

Notes

References

1999 births
Living people
Association football people from Kanagawa Prefecture
Rikkyo University alumni
Japanese footballers
Association football forwards
J2 League players
Iwate Grulla Morioka players